Charles Francis Crowley (c. 1887 – November 3, 1954) was an American football player and coach. He played college football at Harvard University and the University of Notre Dame. Crowley served as football head coach at the University of Dallas from 1913 to 1916 and Columbia University from 1925 to 1929. His four-year tenure at the University of Dallas produced school records in wins (18) and winning percentage (.760). The 1915 season brought Dallas the independent championship of the Southwest and a 6–1 record. Crowley was commissioned by the United States Army as a field artillery officer during World War I in France. Crowley lead Columbia to a 26–16–4 record in five seasons as head coach.

A native of Cambridge, Massachusetts, Crowley attended Cambridge Rindge and Latin School before earning a A.B. degree from Harvard in 1911 and Bachelor of Laws degree from Notre Dame Law School in 1913. He later worked as lawyer for the Veterans Administration in Boston and as a realtor in Cambridge. Crowley died at the age of 67, on November 3, 1954, at his home in Cambridge.

Head coaching record

References

Year of birth missing
1880s births
1954 deaths
20th-century American lawyers
American football ends
American real estate brokers
Columbia Lions football coaches
Dallas Crusaders baseball coaches
Dallas Hilltoppers football coaches
Harvard Crimson football coaches
Harvard Crimson football players
Notre Dame Fighting Irish football players
Cambridge Rindge and Latin School alumni
United States Army personnel of World War I
United States Army officers
Lawyers from Boston
Sportspeople from Cambridge, Massachusetts
Coaches of American football from Massachusetts
Players of American football from Massachusetts
Military personnel from Massachusetts